Rock of Ages: The Definitive Collection is the North American version of the second compilation album by the British rock band Def Leppard. The two-disc anthology featuring 35 hit songs by the band and was released in North America on 17 May 2005. The album charted at No. 10 on the Billboard 200.

Release
Its worldwide release equivalent, Best of Def Leppard, has a slightly different track listing, different artwork, different "previously unreleased" song and was released on 25 October 2004.

This is the only Def Leppard hits compilation (as of now) that features the full-length version of "Bringin' On the Heartbreak" that fades into the instrumental "Switch 625" .

Originally released only in North America, Rock of Ages was released in Europe on 28 January 2008.

Track listing

The edited version of "Billy's Got a Gun" removes the 56-second coda at the end.

Charts

Weekly charts

Year-end charts

Certifications

References

Def Leppard compilation albums
2005 greatest hits albums
Island Records compilation albums
Mercury Records compilation albums